UNAT may refer to:

United Nations Administrative Tribunal (1950–2009)
United Nations Appeals Tribunal, formed in 2009 to replace the United Nations Administrative Tribunal
 Unat, a symbol for natural uranium